The Automobil-Verkehrs- und Übungsstraße ('Automobile traffic and training road'), known as AVUS, is a public road in Berlin, Germany. Opened in 1921, it was also used as a motor racing circuit until 1998. Today, the AVUS forms the northern part of the Bundesautobahn 115.

Circuit
The highway is located in the southwestern districts of Berlin, linking the Stadtring at the Funkturm junction in Charlottenburg with Nikolassee. It runs through the Grunewald forest along the historic Königsweg road from Charlottenburg to Potsdam and the parallel Berlin-Blankenheim railway line.

While normal for a road, it is unusually shaped for a race track as it is essentially two long straights in the form of a dual carriageway, with a hairpin corner at each end. The north curve featured a steep banking from 1937 to 1967.

History
In 1907 the Kaiserlicher Automobilclub (KAC) association devised a fee-financed circuit, as both a motor-sport venue and a testing track for the motor industry. A developing company was established in 1909; however, a lack of finances and official authorisations delayed the start of construction until spring 1913. During the Great War works discontinued, and though Russian Army prisoners were temporarily employed in AVUS's construction, the track was still unfinished. From 1920 the remaining road work was financed by businessman and politician Hugo Stinnes. The circuit, including a gate building and several stands, was inaugurated during the first post-war International Automobile Exhibition (IAA) with a motor race on 24 September 1921. Afterwards the road was open to the public at a charge of ten Marks.

Race track

While the Grand Prix motor racing scene still evaded German tracks, the circuit from 1922 was also the site of motorcycle races. On 11 July 1926 the track played host to the first international German Grand Prix for sports cars, organised by the Automobilclub von Deutschland, the former KAC. The 1921 roadway turned out to be insufficient: Already, in practice two days before, the young Italian driver Enrico Platé (not to be confused with the Argentinian driver and team owner of the same name) was involved in a crash that killed his mechanic. During the race, in heavy rain, two track marshals died when Adolf Rosenberger lost control and hit the indicator board and the timekeeper's box, with a third employee succumbing to his injuries in hospital a few hours later. The Grand Prix was won by his fellow team-member, the so-far unknown Mercedes-Benz salesman Rudolf Caracciola, from Remagen, driving a private, eight-cylinder "Monza" Kompressor type.

From 1927 the German Grand Prix was relocated to the new and more secure Nürburgring circuit in the Western German Eifel range, while the AVUS received a new asphalt surface and served as an experimental track for rocket cars.

Due to the Great Depression annual auto races were not resumed until 1931, when Caracciola again won in a Mercedes-Benz SSK, succeeded by Manfred von Brauchitsch the next year after Caracciola had switched to Alfa Romeo. 

The competition on 22 May 1932 saw further notable participants like the Earl Howe, Hans Stuck and Sir Malcolm Campbell. The Czechoslovak driver, Prince George Christian of Lobkowicz, died when his Bugatti Type 54 crashed in the southern hairpin. The following events were won by Achille Varzi (1933) and Guy Moll (1934), to the great annoyance of the new Nazi rulers, who declared the victory of German drivers and cars a matter of national pride. They strongly backed the construction of the new Silver Arrows (Silberpfeile) generation of Mercedes-Benz and Auto Union.

In an effort to make AVUS the "world's fastest race track", the 1936 season was skipped and while the track hosted the cycling road race, the marathon and 50 km walk athletic events of the 1936 Summer Olympics, the north curve was turned into a steeply banked turn (43°) made of bricks. It became dubbed the wall of death, especially as it had no retaining barrier, so cars that missed the turn easily flew off it. The Silver Arrows raced only once on the banked version, in 1937. As the AVUS race did not count towards the championship, non-GP cars were allowed, which permitted the use of streamlined cars, similar to the cars used for high speed record attempts. This race was run in two heats; during qualifying for the second heat, Luigi Fagioli stuck his Auto Union Type C on pole position, with a time of 4 minutes and 8.2 seconds at an average speed of  - which was the fastest motor racing lap in history until this time was bettered by Tony Bettenhausen in qualifying for the 1957 Race of Two Worlds at Monza. It was also bettered by four drivers during the 1971 Indianapolis 500.

No major race was held after 1937 as, in early 1938, the popular German race driver Bernd Rosemeyer was killed in a land speed record attempt on a straight section of the Autobahn Frankfurt–Darmstadt (present-day Bundesautobahn 5), at which point the high-speed AVUS was considered too dangerous for the fast Grand Prix race cars. Furthermore, it was to be connected to the growing Reichsautobahn network in 1940 by extending it south towards the Berliner Ring, therefore the original hairpin at Nikolassee was demolished and replaced by a junction. A planned banked south turn was never built; the cleared grounds in the Grunewald forest were used as a proving ground ("Keerans Range") by the American occupation forces after World War II.

Post-war
The first AVUS race after the war was held on 1 July 1951 for Formula Two and Formula Three cars, won by East German driver Paul Greifzu. After World War II, the Berlin Wall, with its Checkpoint Bravo at Dreilinden/Drewitz, came no closer than about one mile (1.6 km) to the former South Turn. It is a common yet incorrect belief that the Berlin Wall cut the AVUS in half.

It was not until 19 September 1954 that this shorter track hosted a non-championship Formula One race. This "Grand Prix of Berlin" was mainly a show dominated by the Mercedes-Benz W196 drivers Karl Kling (the winner) and Juan Manuel Fangio. No serious competition was present, as many teams had refused to show up and the German Grand Prix was still held on the Nürburgring. Finally AVUS hosted its only world championship Formula One race with the 1959 German Grand Prix on 2 August, won by Tony Brooks. This race weekend also saw the death of French driver Jean Behra in a supporting sports car race, as his Porsche RSK flew over the top of the north turn banking, as there was no wall or fence. German driver and journalist Richard von Frankenberg had previously walked away from a similar spectacular crash at the same site, but Behra would have no such luck as his body impacted a flagpole head-first after he was flung from his car.

After 1961, Grand Prix racing did not race on banked circuits until 2021. The banked sections at Autodromo Nazionale Monza and Autodrome de Linas-Montlhéry were considered dangerous by international racing standards. They were used in connection with chicanes for some time, then abandoned.  Banking only returned to Formula One in 2021 when the redesigned Circuit Zandvoort featured 18-degree banked turns at John Hugenholtz and Arie Luyendijk (the former Bos Uit).  The AVUS banking was dismantled in 1967 to give way to an expanded intersection under the Funkturm tower. From the top of this tower, one can see that the AVUS is not perfectly straight.

The old banked circuit can be seen in the film A Dandy in Aspic (1968) featuring period racing cars.

Racing was continued with a flat north turn, but AVUS only held national touring cars DTM and Formula 3 events. The length of the track was roughly cut in half twice in the 1980s and 1990 as racing on straights became unpopular. Also, chicanes were added to reduce entry speed into the North Curve. Yet, some incidents and accidents occurred. The BMW of Dieter Quester rolled over when exiting the last corner, and crossed the finish line sliding on its roof, with sparks flying, for a podium finish. The car of John Winter hit a barrier and exploded into a fireball in North Curve, which he survived.

In 1995, the race 2 of DTM had to be cancelled, after a multi-car pileup blocked the circuit; later that September, British driver Kieth O'dor was killed in a Super Touring Car event when his car spun and was rammed sideways, with the impact on the driver's side.

AVUS today
After the fall of the Berlin wall, the closure of the AVUS for race events became increasingly problematic over traffic and associated environmental concerns. After the last races in 1998, a farewell event with veterans was held in 1999. Since 2000, the new EuroSpeedway Lausitz in Brandenburg is considered the replacement venue for competition. The round race control tower at the north end still remains with its prominent Mercedes-Benz and Bosch sponsorship insignia. It is used as a (now closed) public restaurant and motel. The old wooden grandstand is protected as a historic monument.

Gallery

Lap times
The official race lap records at AVUS are listed as:

See also
 List of Formula One circuits
 EuroSpeedway Lausitz

References

External links

1936 Summer Olympics official report. Volume 2. pp. 644–7, 682-5, 932-5.
 FORIX about the AVUS track
 Historic Purpose Built Grand Prix Circuits on Google Maps

Venues of the 1936 Summer Olympics
Olympic athletics venues
Formula One circuits
German Grand Prix
Defunct motorsport venues in Germany
Roads in Berlin
Sports venues in Berlin
Olympic cycling venues
Motorsport in Berlin